Lakshmi Menon (born 19 May 1996) is an Indian actress, who mainly appears in Tamil films. After making her acting debut in a supporting role in the Malayalam film Raghuvinte Swantham Raziya (2011), she played the female lead in her debut Tamil film Kumki in 2012.

She is a winner of Filmfare Award for Best Female Debut – South in 2013. She has also received Tamil Nadu State Film Award for Best Actress for her roles in Sundarapandian and Kumki.

Early life
Lakshmi Menon was born to Malayali parents Ramakrishnan, a Dubai based artist, and Usha Menon, a dance teacher from Kochi.

Career
In 2011, Malayalam director Vinayan, who saw her during Bharatanatyam telecast, cast her in his film Raghuvinte Swantham Raziya. She was in her eight grade when she acted in the film. Soon after, she played the lead along with Vineeth in another Malayalam film titled Ideal Couple, directed by Ali Akbar. Director Prabu Solomon cast her in Kumki opposite actor Vikram Prabhu. Watching her performance, director Prabhakaran offered her the lead role in Sundarapandian opposite M. Sasikumar, which released before Kumki and marked her Tamil debut. After acting with Sasikumar again in Kutti Puli, she was seen as a demure school teacher Malar in Suseenthiran's action-drama film Pandianadu, which co-starred Vishal.

In Naan Sigappu Manithan saw her pairing up with Vishal again. She acted in two Tamil films, Manja Pye with Vimal and Jigarthanda with Siddharth in 2014. She completed Sippai with Gautham Karthik, and Komban had hit the screens and got her a good name for her role Palani ammal. On 10 November, her movie Vedalam movie was released in which she portrayed the role of sister for Ajith Kumar and she was well praised by the critics for the performance in that movie. In 2016 she did a movie named Miruthan with Jayam Ravi which was the first Tamil zombie movie.

The next project Pulikkuthi Pandi (2021) is Lakshmi Menon's third film under M. Muthaiah's direction, and the film will also mark the actress comeback on big screens after four years.

Filmography

As actress

As singer

Awards and nominations

References

External links

1996 births
Living people
21st-century Indian actresses
21st-century Indian singers
21st-century Indian women singers
Actresses from Kochi
Actresses in Malayalam cinema
Actresses in Tamil cinema
Film musicians from Kerala
Indian women playback singers
Indian film actresses
Malayalam playback singers
South Indian International Movie Awards winners
Singers from Kochi
Women musicians from Kerala